Blue Odyssey is the fourth album led by saxophonist Houston Person which was recorded in 1968 and released on the Prestige label.

Reception

AllMusic reviewer Scott Yanow stated: "Houston Person, the definitive soul-jazz tenor saxophonist of the past 30 years, is in excellent form on this early session."

Track listing 
All compositions by Cedar Walton, except where indicated.
 "Blue Odyssey" – 7:42  
 "Holy Land" – 6:45  
 "I Love You Yes I Do" (Henry Glover, Sally Nix) – 3:45  
 "Funky London" (Cal Massey) – 4:53  
 "Please Send Me Someone to Love" (Percy Mayfield) – 7:14  
 "Starrburst" (Ellen Starr) – 6:09

Personnel 
Houston Person – tenor saxophone
Curtis Fuller – trombone
Pepper Adams – baritone saxophone  
Cedar Walton – piano
Bob Cranshaw – bass
Frank Jones – drums

References 

1968 albums
Houston Person albums
Prestige Records albums
Albums produced by Don Schlitten